The Gwangju Students Movement is a movement that was started to fight against Japanese Imperialism. This began to take place starting on November 3, 1929. However, this wasn't the only movement of the time. There was a second movement which was led by a great amount of Gwangju Middle School students on May 20, 1943. The reason why these movements had originally sparked was because of a small incident where a Korean girl was being harassed at Naju (나주) Station on October 30 of that same year as the first movement. These movements were important because it gained Korea their freedom from the Japanese and thus receiving the independence that they fought for although there were many casualties and upsets.

Timeline

The whole movement began and took place on November 3, 1929, and many events had taken place throughout the movement. Here is a list of things that had happened along the way of their independence.

November 3, 1926 - Students attending Gwangju High School come together and create a secret group against Japanese rule.

October 30, 1929 - Korean and Japanese students clash on a train going from Gangju to Naju Station.

November 3, 1929 - 54,000 Students participate in the outbreak of the Gwangju Students protesting against Japanese Imperialism.

February 12, 1930 - Those who were related with the uprising and protest were brought to trial.

May 20, 1943 - A second strike sparks into action by Gwangju Seo Middle School students.

October 20, 1953 - Officially establishing the Students day.

March 30, 1973 - Abolition of Students Day.

September 19, 1984 - "Students Day" is re-established as the national memorial day for Korea.

Results of the movement
The independence movement that was executed by the 54 thousand high school students helped not only their own movement, but many other anti-Japanese movements. Many of those who participated in the movement against Japanese imperialism had to face sacrifices as well. Many of the protesters who stood up against the Japanese had died of torture, had died in jail, or died after being released due to illness from the harsh conditions of the jails. Also after being released from prisons, many of those were monitored by the Japanese so they would not have been able to live a good life anymore. However, after all of this was over, many good things did happen as well. Of course one of them was that the Japanese were pushed out of the country, but also a Student's day was established. This was a memorial day for all of those students who had participated in fighting against the Japanese imperialism.

See also
Gwangju Uprising
Gwangju Student Independence Movement
Korea under Japanese rule

References

Japan–Korea relations